Bryce John Stevens (born 1957) is a horror writer, illustrator and editor. He grew up in Christchurch, New Zealand and moved to Sydney in the mid-1980s. From childhood he was fascinated with the supernatural and terrifying consequences of events from stories such as  "The Tinderbox", a predilection which continued through his high school years and beyond.

Editorial career

Between 1987 and 1992 he co-edited (with Chris G.C. Sequeira and Leigh Blackmore), Terror Australis: The Australian Horror and Fantasy Magazine (1987–92). A column by Stevens, "Every Time the Candle Burns", appeared in Issues 1 and 3 of Terror Australis, and he reviewed books under both his own name and the pseudonym of David Kuraria for the magazine's "In the Bad Books" column. Stevens was the basis for the character 'Doc Martin' as drawn and photographed in various of Christopher Sequeira's occult detective graphic novel series, Deadlocke and Doc Martin (in Pulse of Darkness and elsewhere).

Stevens contributed interior art to numerous horror magazines in the 1990s in Australia and also cover art for issues of E.O.D, Shoggoth and Bloodsongs.

In the mid-1990s Stevens moved to Melbourne, where he was a key figure (with Steven Proposch and Chris A. Masters) in the Melbourne Horror Society (later known as The Australian Horror Writers) - a forerunner to the Australian Horror Writers Association) - where he helped produce Bloodsongs (1994–95) magazine.  From 1996 through 1998, Stevens was President of the Australian Horror Writers. He edited issues 5-11 of its official newsletter Severed Head

Writings and Art

In 1999 he held his solo art show, the "Screw the Millennium Bug Exhibition" at Melbourne's Blue Velvet Lounge. His story of the same year, "Rookwood" (Aurealis No 24, 1999) is a collaboration with Rick Kennett and is currently available in the e-book Forbidden Texts (ed. David Bain (CreateSpace, 2013). In the late 1990s he produced several issues of a personal zine, Choking Dog Gazette. Originally a hardcopy zine, the title was revived in 2012 as an online zine; later issues were distributed through the SSWFT amateur press association.

Stevens has published several small press collections of horror stories (see below).

His short stories have also appeared in Black Moon, Bloodsongs, Cold Cuts, Dead By Dawn, E.O.D, Forbidden Tomes, Cthulhu and the Co-Eds: Kids & Squids, Midnight Echo, Misanthrope, Octavia, Outside, and Terror Australis. (magazine and book anthology). Stevens is noted for his hard-edged and uncompromising horror content; however he often delves into black humour and amongst his most reprinted stories are a Lovecraftian parody called "The Diary of Howard Clark Long Phillips"and "Payday" . Some of his horror stories show a black humour reminiscent of a cross between Ben Elton and Joe R. Lansdale. One of his most acclaimed stories is "Sisters of the Moss", most recently reprinted in Orb No 8 (The Best of Orb 1-7).

In 2001 Stevens compiled an encyclopedic reference book on Australian dark fantasy and horror writers and artists, which was released on CD-ROM only. In a lengthy review of this work, Rick Kennett concluded: "In later days The Fear Codex will be the work from where research into Australian horror and dark fantasy will start."

Stevens lived again in Sydney from 2004 to 2008. His artwork of that period includes work for the metal band Inslain (see Sadistik Exekution).

Recent career

He relocated to Johns River City of Greater Taree NSW in 2009 where he works as an on-call handler of venomous reptiles. He continues to draw and paint, and holds regular exhibitions of his work in different cities in Australia. He has controversially used his own blood in some of his paintings which he refers to as "blood works". His novel in progress is The Malign Comedy.

Collections
 Pale Flesh (Borderlands Press, 1989)
 Visions of Torment (Spine Publications, 1993)
 Skin Tight (Bambada Press, 1995) 
 Stalking the Demon: Tales of Sex and Insanity (Jacobyte Books, 2002). Features cover art by Stevens.

Uncollected works
 Review of Stephen Jones (editor) (ed), Shadows Over Innsmouth. Skintomb  (1994). 
 "A Humorous Look at Sex in Horror" (nf). Severed Head 4 (April 1994), 8–9. 
 "Bandages" (ss) Bloodsongs #6 (1995) 
 "Sleep Deprivation and Its Consequences." (nf) Severed Head 9 (July 1995).
 "Clark Ashton Smith". Acrostic. Black Moon 4 (1995).
 "Arthur Machen". Acrostic. Black Moon 4 (1995).  
 "Behind the Fear Codex" (nf) Orb Speculative Fiction #2 (2001) 
 "The Lord of Lewd: Clark Ashton Smith and the Fiction of Fornication". [Parody]. Mantichore 2, No 1 (Dec 2006). 
 "Of Caves, Dark Holes and Vaginas: The Pornographic Prose of the Providence Poet". [Parody re H.P. Lovecraft.)Mantichore 2, No 1 (Dec 2006) 
 "Two Acrostics on H.P. Lovecraft". Mantichore 2, No 2 (March 2007). [Poetry].
 "And They Shall Suffer for Their Art" (ss).Midnight Echo 5 (Feb 2011).

Magazines edited or co-edited
 Terror Australis (1988–92)(with Leigh Blackmore and Chris G.C. Sequeira)
 Bloodsongs (1993–98). (with Steven Proposch and Chris A. Masters) See: https://web.archive.org/web/20111006213706/http://www.chrisamasters.com/bloodsongs/bloodsongs.html
 Severed Head: Newsletter of the Horror Writers of Australia (1994–96)

Other works

As editor. 
As editor. * As editor/compiler. The Australian H.P. Lovecraft Centenary Calendar 1990-1991. Sydney: Terror Australis, 1990.
 Strange Vistas (1991) Artwork.
 As editor/compiler/artist (with Kurt Stone). Razor Caress Calendar 1992-93 (Spine Publications). Featuring art by Stevens, Kurt Stone, Antoinette Rydyr and Steve 'Carnage' Carter.
 As editor/compiler. The Fear Codex: The Australian Encyclopedia of Dark Fantasy and Horror (2001)(CD-ROM)
 "Kurtus Interruptus". An interview with Australian comics artist Kurt Stone. Boodsongs 4 (Autumn 1995)

References

 Mike Ashley & William G. Contento. The Supernatural Index: A Listing of Fantasy, Supernatural, Occult, Weird and Horror Anthologies. Westport, CT: Greenwood Press, 1995, p. 523
 Donna Maree Hanson. Australian Speculative Fiction: A Genre Overview. Canberra: Australian Speculative Fiction, 2005, p. 115
 Paul Collins (ed). The Melbourne University Press Encyclopedia of Australian Science Fiction and Fantasy. Melbourne, Vic: Melbourne University Press, 1998, p. 162.
 "Horror Writers". Feature interview with Stevens and Kirstyn McDermott. The Big Issue c. 1997, p. 16-17.

External links

1957 births
Living people
Australian painters
Australian horror writers
New Zealand emigrants to Australia